The 2020–21 Hrvatski telekom Premijer liga was the 30th season of the HT Premijer liga, the top-tier professional basketball league in Croatia. The season started on 18 September 2020.

Format 
All participants in Premijer liga including teams that play ABA League joined the regular season. It will play with a triple round-robin format where the eight first qualified teams joined the playoffs, while the penultimate will be play relegation playoffs and last qualified one was relegated.

Current teams

Promotion and relegation 
Since the previous season was cancelled, there was no promotion and relegation.

Venues and locations

Personnel and sponsorships

Regular season

Standings

Results

Playoffs

Relegation playoffs 
As of the 2020–21 season, team who lost the 2020–21 First League final and the 11th placed team of the 2020–21 Premijer liga season will play in the Qualifiers for a spot in the 2021–22 Premijer liga season.

Teams 
 11th Premijer liga team: Furnir
 2nd First League team: Dinamo Zagreb

Results 
 

|}

References

External links
Official website 
Scoresway page
Eurobasket.com league page

A-1 Liga seasons
Croatian
2020–21 in Croatian basketball